Leonovskaya is a rural locality (a village) in Nizhne-Vazhskoye Rural Settlement, Verkhovazhsky District, Vologda Oblast, Russia. The population was 14 as of 2002.

Geography 
Leonovskaya is located 17 km northeast of Verkhovazhye (the district's administrative centre) by road. Podgorodye is the nearest rural locality.

References 

Rural localities in Verkhovazhsky District